VH2 was a sister channel to VH1 in the United Kingdom. It launched in 2003, and slowly became an Indie rock channel, aimed primarily at men in the 25-34 demographic. It mainly showed music videos, though it also aired documentaries about artists VH2 played.

VH2 also had many chart shows, including the "Indie 500" weekend, which counted down the Top 500 Indie Songs with songs by artists such as The Stone Roses, Pixies, Oasis, Dinosaur Jr, The Cure, The Strokes, Blur and Radiohead. The winner of the Indie 500 was "There Is a Light That Never Goes Out" by The Smiths, whilst The Stone Roses' song "I Wanna Be Adored" was second (though on a condensed version of the counting listing just the top 50, the two tracks had switched place, leading "I Wanna Be Adored" to first place)

VH2 closed at 6 a.m. on 1 August 2006 and was replaced by MTV Flux. Its last days saw it unspool older MTV idents of the past.

References

Defunct television channels in the United Kingdom
Television channels and stations established in 2003
Music video networks in the United Kingdom
Television channels and stations disestablished in 2006
2003 establishments in the United Kingdom
2006 disestablishments in the United Kingdom
VH1